Cozzene (May 8, 1980 – October 7, 2008) was an American Champion Thoroughbred racehorse and outstanding sire. He was bred and raced by U.S. Racing Hall of Fame inductee John A. Nerud and trained by his son, Jan.

Cozzene began racing at age three, winning three of six starts. At age four he won three more races from ten starts and ran third in the Breeders' Cup Mile. In 1985, the then five-year-old Cozzene had his best year in racing with wins in won four of eight starts. The previous year, in the inaugural running of the Breeders' Cup Mile at Hollywood Park Racetrack, Cozzene had finished third but came back to win the November 2, 1985 edition at Aqueduct Racetrack . His 1985 performances earned him the 1985 Eclipse Award for American Champion Male Turf Horse.

Stallion Career 
Retired to stud duty, in 1996 Cozzene was the Leading sire in North America and in 2002 the  Leading International Sire. He stands at Gainesway Farm in Lexington, Kentucky. During his career he has sired thirty-one graded stakes winners and fourteen millionaires including:
 Cozzene's Prince (b. 1987) - millionaire 1993 Canadian Champion Older Male Horse
 Fearless Revival (b. 1987) - Dam of Pivotal
 Star of Cozzene (b. 1988) - multiple Grade 1 winner and earner of more than $2.3 million
 Environment Friend (b. 1988) - English Champion, winner of Eclipse Stakes
 Tikkanen (b. 1991) - won Breeders' Cup Turf, earner of more than $1.5 million
 Alphabet Soup (b. 1991) - won 1996 Breeders' Cup Classic, earned more than $2.9 million
 Eishin Berlin (b. 1992) - earner of more than $3.5 million in Japan
 Chorwon (b. 1993) - millionaire, won three straight runnings of the Louisville Handicap
 Admire Cozzene (b. 1996) - earner of more than $3.1 million and champion in Japan
 Zoftig (b.1997) - Winner of the Selene Stakes
 Star Over The Bay (b. 1998) - multiple stakes winner of $917,353
 Mizzen Mast (b.1998) - winner of the Malibu Stakes, Strub Stakes, and Prix de Guiche

Sire Sons 
Cozzene is the grandsire of several graded stakes winners via his sons. They include: 

 Mizzen Mast (b.1998) is the sire of the following Grade I winners:
 Mizdirection - Twice winner of the Breeders' Cup Turf Sprint
 Caravel - Winner of the Breeders' Cup Turf Sprint
 Mast Track - Winner of the Hollywood Gold Cup Stakes
 Flotilla - Winner of the Breeders' Cup Juvenile Fillies Turf and Poule d'Essai des Pouliches
 Lighthouse - Winner of the Coolmore Classic
 Sailor's Valentine - Winner of the Ashland Stakes
 Full Mast - Winner of the Prix Jean-Luc Lagardère
 Midships - Winner of the Charles Whittingham Stakes
 Ultimate Eagle - Winner of the Hollywood Derby
 Alphabet Soup (b.1991) 
 Alphabet Kisses - Winner of the La Brea Stakes
 Egg Drop - Winner of the Matriarch Stakes
 Our New Recruit - Winner of the Dubai Golden Shaheen
 Alpha Bettor - Canadian Champion Older Male Horse
 Phantom Light - Canadian Champion Older Male Horse
 Admire Cozzene (b.1996) 
 Snow Dragon - Winner of the Sprinters Stakes

Death 
Cozzene was euthanized on October 7, 2008 at Gainesway Farm in Kentucky. The stallion had had melanoma, a disease many gray horses get, for years but it had not caused him any pain until recently.

Pedigree

References

 Cozzene's pedigree and partial racing stats
 Cozzene at Gainesway Farm

1980 racehorse births
Racehorses bred in Florida
Racehorses trained in the United States
Breeders' Cup Mile winners
Eclipse Award winners
United States Champion Thoroughbred Sires
Thoroughbred family 4-m
2008 racehorse deaths